Sally Brayley (also known as Sarah Brayley Bliss; born September 18, 1937) is a Canadian-American ballet dancer. She has performed as a principal dancer with the Metropolitan Opera and the New York City Opera. She was described by Webster University as "an internationally renowned ballet dancer, coach, and master teacher." Ronald Reagan appointed her to the National Council on the Arts for a six-year term in 1986.

Early life and education 
Brayley was born in London, England to Canadian parents on September 18, 1937. She was raised in Halifax, Nova Scotia. Her father was a journalist and his career caused the family to make several moves, from Montreal to Ottawa to Halifax. She began taking dance lessons at the age of five and the family ensured that she continued studying dance wherever they moved. She left high school to pursue a career in dance.

Career 
In 1956, Brayley began dancing at the National Ballet of Canada. She left the company when she moved to New York in 1962. In the United States, she performed as a guest artist with the American Ballet Theatre and the Joffrey Ballet. She performed as a principal dancer with the Metropolitan Opera and the New York City Opera.

In 1969, Brayley co-founded the Joffrey II Dancers, a ballet troupe for beginning dancers, and served as artistic director until 1986. There, she trained 16 dancers, including Ron Reagan, the son of President Ronald Reagan.

In 1987, after Antony Tudor's death, Brayley was named Trustee of the Antony Tudor Ballet Trust. In 1995, she left New York City and became Executive Director of Dance St. Louis. After working there for 11 years, she was named Executive Director Emeritus. At the company, Brayley widely expanded its education and outreach programs, established the organization's fundraising programs, and "[maintained] an unbroken tradition of bringing extraordinary dance to St. Louis audiences." Brayley retired from Dance St. Louis in June 2006.

Honors and awards 
The Sally Brayley Bliss Award is named after her and is awarded by Dance Nova Scotia to choreographers continuing with their dance studies.

In 1986, Ronald Reagan appointed her for a six-year term to the National Council on the Arts, succeeding Martha Graham.

In 1988, the Canadian Women’s Club of New York City honored Brayley as Woman of the Year.

Personal life 
In 1967, Brayley married Anthony Addison Bliss, a lawyer who was the former General Manager of the Metropolitan Opera. They resided in Oyster Bay, New York. Bliss died in 1991. The couple had two sons, Mark and Timothy.

Brayley is a breast-cancer survivor.

References 

Living people
People from Halifax, Nova Scotia
1937 births
Canadian ballerinas
American ballerinas
American female dancers
Canadian female dancers
National Ballet of Canada dancers
Metropolitan Opera people
Canadian expatriates in the United States